Major General Charles Gerard Courtenay Vyvyan,  (born 29 September 1944) is a retired British Army officer. He served as Head of the British Defence Staff and Defence Attaché in Washington, D.C. (1997–2000), and Gentleman Usher of the Scarlet Rod (2006–2018).

Early life and education
Vyvyan was born on 29 September 1944 to Elizabeth and John Vyvyan. His father was a diplomat, British Army veteran, and history fellow at Trinity College, Cambridge. He was educated at Winchester College, an all-boys private school in Winchester, Hampshire. He studied modern history at Balliol College, Oxford, graduating with Bachelor of Arts (BA) degree in 1966.

Military career
Vyvyan was commissioned into the Royal Green Jackets in 1967. After a two-year secondment to the Sultan of Oman's Land Forces in the mid-1970s, he became commanding officer of 1st Battalion Royal Green Jackets in 1984, Commander 3rd Infantry Brigade in 1988 and Deputy Chief of Staff at Headquarters UK Land Forces in 1994. He went on to be Head of the British Defence Staff and Defence Attaché in Washington, D.C. in 1997 before retiring in 2000.

Later life
Vyvyan was a visiting fellow at the Eisenhower Institute in Washington, D.C., from 2002 to 2006. He was appointed Gentleman Usher of the Scarlet Rod in 2006: he stepped down in 2018.

References

 

|-

 
 

Living people
Gentlemen Ushers
British Army generals
1944 births
Companions of the Order of the Bath
Commanders of the Order of the British Empire
People educated at Winchester College
Alumni of Balliol College, Oxford
British military attachés